Simon Kainzwaldner (born 24 February 1994) is an Italian Olympic luge athlete who currently races for his nation on the World Cup circuit in the Men's doubles event as a pair with Emanuel Rieder.

Life and career
At the 2012 Youth Winter Olympics in Innsbruck, Austria representing Italy in the Boys' singles and doubles luge events as well as the mixed team relay event. Kainzwaldner finished with the gold in tandem with his racing partner Florian Gruber in the doubles, 10th the boys singles, and with his teammates Andrea Voetter, Daniel Gatterer, and Florian Gruber, fifth in the mixed relay competition. Kainzwaldner and Gruber have remained a doubles pair in international luge competition ever since their appearance in the Boys division and finished in tenth place in the 2014–15 Luge World Cup standings including a fifth-place showing in the opening race at Innsbruck.

References

External links

Italian male lugers
Living people
1994 births
Lugers at the 2012 Winter Youth Olympics
Lugers at the 2022 Winter Olympics
Sportspeople from Bolzano
Olympic lugers of Italy
Youth Olympic gold medalists for Italy